Paranautilus is a genus of the Nautiloid family Liroceratidae with a very involute, moderately globular, smooth shell. The venter, at the outer rim, is arched, grading into broadly convex flanks. The dorsom, on the inner rim, is deeply impressed.  Septa a close spaced, with slightly sinuous sutures. A member of the Clydonautilaceae, Paranautilus lived during the Middle and Late Triassic (Anisian - Norian) in what is now North America, Europe, and south Asia. Contemporary Liroceratids include Indonautilus and Sibyllonautilus.

References

 Bernhard Kummel, 1964.  Nautiloidea-Nautilida. Treatise on Invertebrate Paleontology, Part K. Geological Soc. of America and University of Kansas press. Teichert and Moore (eds)
 Paranautilus -Paleodb

Prehistoric nautiloid genera
Anisian first appearances
Norian extinctions